Léon Delpech (born 13 August 2002) is a French professional footballer who plays as a midfielder for Ligue 2 club Nîmes.

Club career 
On 24 July 2021, Delpech made his professional debut for Nîmes in a 1–1 Ligue 2 draw against Bastia.

References

External links

2002 births
Living people
Footballers from Bordeaux
French footballers
Association football midfielders
Nîmes Olympique players
Ligue 2 players
Championnat National 2 players
Championnat National 3 players